Songkhla Football Club (Thai สโมสรฟุตบอลจังหวัดสงขลา) is a Thailand semi-professional football club based in Songkhla Province, a province located in Southern Thailand. The club is currently playing in the Thai League 3 Southern region.

History

1999–2011: Early history
Songkhla F.C. (original) was established in 1999, and it then first played in the Thailand Provincial League, a former league, parallel to the Thai Premier League. In the founding year of the league, 1999, reached the eighth place in the league table.

In the years after it was found mostly back in the bottom of the table regions. In 2007, the club was runner-up of the Provincial League and played the following year in the Thailand Division 2 League. Surprisingly, it was the end of the season, again winning a second place and went on to the newly formed Thai Division 1 League.

In 2009 Thai Division 1 League, they finished a creditable 7th. They fared even better in 2010 Thai Division 1 League and just missed out on automatic promotion by 2 points. Their 4th-placed finished earned them a place in the Thai Premier League play-offs. Unfortunately the Bulls couldn't maintain their end off season form and finished bottom of their play-off group.

In this 2011 Thai Division 1 League, the team have an average attendance of around 18.000, with a peak of 23.000 people at Tinsulanonda Stadium during last matches. Highest attendance Songkhla F.C. 1–1 Buriram F.C. (36,715) (7 August 2011) . Their star and top striker with 17 scores is the Brazilian Chayene Santos.

Merging: Songkhla United and Songkhla
The club was dissolved and merged with Songkhla United in 2012.

2018–present: A breath of hope

Songkhla football club was come back  and played in 2018 Thailand Amateur League Southern Region.

The Samila Mermaid won promotion from the Fifth tier of the Thai football league system Thailand Amateur League Southern region in 2019 – beating Jantrangcee Saba Yoi City in the lower southern subregion final and beating Patong City in the southern region final. They qualified for the 2019 Thailand Amateur League championship stage as southern winner.

Crest

The club logo incorporates elements from the mermaid statue. Mermaid comes from the story Phra Aphai Mani by Sunthorn Phu.

Stadium

Tinsulanonda Stadium is a multi-purpose stadium in Songkhla, Thailand. Named after the Songkhla-born former Thai prime minister Prem Tinsulanonda, it is used mostly for football matches.

The stadium has a capacity of 45,000 but just 10,000 of those spaces are covered in a small single-tiered stand along one touchline. The rest of the stadium is a continuous curving tier. The stadium hosted one of the semi-finals in the 1998 Asian Games men's football tournament.

Honours
Songkhla F.C. original
Provincial League:
Runners-up (1): 2007
Thai Division 2 League:
Runners-up (1): 2008
Songkhla F.C. new era
Thai League 3 Southern Region:
Champions (2): 2020–21, 2022–23
Thailand Amateur League:
Champions (1): 2019

Stadium and locations

Season by season record

P = Played
W = Games won
D = Games drawn
L = Games lost
F = Goals for
A = Goals against
Pts = Points
Pos = Final position

TPL = Thai Premier League
DIV1 = Thai Division 1 League
DIV2 = Thai Division 2 League
Pro League = Provincial League
TL = Thai League
T1 = Thai League 1
T2 = Thai League 2
T3 = Thai League 3
T4 = Thai League 4
TA = Thailand Amateur League

DQ = Disqualified
PR = Preliminary Round
QR1 = First Qualifying Round
QR2 = Second Qualifying Round
QR3 = Third Qualifying Round
PO = Play-off
R1 = Round 1
R2 = Round 2
R3 = Round 3
R4 = Round 4

R5 = Round 5
R6 = Round 6
GS = Group Stage
KR = Knockout Round
R16 = Round of 16
QF = Quarter-finals
SF = Semi-finals
RU = Runners-up
S = Shared
W = Winners

Players

Current squad

Club staff

References

External links
 
 Official Website
 Songkhla FC Fan Site 

Football clubs in Thailand
Association football clubs established in 2018
Sport in Songkhla province
2018 establishments in Thailand